Spatulignatha idiogena is a moth in the family Lecithoceridae. It is found in Taiwan and the provinces of Fujian and Sichuan in China.

The wingspan is 19–20 mm. The ground colour of the forewing is yellowish white, and the discal dot at the end of the cell is larger than the median dot. The hindwings are grey.

References

Moths described in 1994
Spatulignatha